Urszula Danuta Augustyn (born 1 September 1964 in Tarnów) is a Polish politician. A member of the Polish parliament of the 5th, 6th, 7th, 8th and 9th term. Since 2019, deputy-chairman of Commission for Petitions  and a member of Commission for Culture and Media in Sejm.

See also
Members of Polish Sejm 2005-2007

References

External links 
 Urszula Augustyn - parliamentary page - includes declarations of interest, voting record, and transcripts of speeches.

Women members of the Sejm of the Republic of Poland
Civic Platform politicians
Politicians from Tarnów
1964 births
Living people
21st-century Polish women politicians
Members of the Polish Sejm 2005–2007
Members of the Polish Sejm 2007–2011
Members of the Polish Sejm 2011–2015
Members of the Polish Sejm 2015–2019
Members of the Polish Sejm 2019–2023